Święty Krzyż TV Tower ( Polish: RTCN Święty Krzyż ) is the tallest free-standing TV tower in Poland. (Taller architectural structures in Poland are guyed masts or highrise buildings and chimneys equipped with antennas). Święty Krzyż TV Tower, which was built in 1966, is a 157 metre tall concrete TV tower situated near the monastery on Łysa Góra. Święty Krzyż TV Tower is not accessible by tourists. The hyperbolic-shaped basement floors resemble those of the Ochsenkopf TV Tower in Germany.

Transmitted programs

The tower is used for transmitting the following FM and TV programs

FM radio

Digital radio

Digital television MPEG-4

External links
 Object on Emitel website
 Skyscarperpage
 RadioPolska website
 Map Coverage
 DVB-T in Świętokrzyskie

See also
 List of towers

Towers completed in 1966
Hyperboloid structures
Kielce County
Buildings and structures in Świętokrzyskie Voivodeship
Radio masts and towers in Poland
1966 establishments in Poland